Ectopsocopsis is a genus of outer barklice in the family Ectopsocidae. There are more than 30 described species in Ectopsocopsis.

Species
These 36 species belong to the genus Ectopsocopsis:

 Ectopsocopsis annulata Badonnel, 1955
 Ectopsocopsis anura Badonnel, 1955
 Ectopsocopsis badonneli (Ball, 1943)
 Ectopsocopsis baidichengensis Li, 1997
 Ectopsocopsis balli (Badonnel, 1949)
 Ectopsocopsis beijingensis Li, 2002
 Ectopsocopsis biporosa Li, 1992
 Ectopsocopsis biunciata Li, 2002
 Ectopsocopsis brevimanubria Li, 2002
 Ectopsocopsis bulbiapicia Li, 2002
 Ectopsocopsis clavellata Li, 2002
 Ectopsocopsis cognata Thornton & Wong, 1968
 Ectopsocopsis corbiformis Li, 1993
 Ectopsocopsis crassiuncata Li, 1997
 Ectopsocopsis cryptomeriae (Enderlein, 1907) (large-winged psocid)
 Ectopsocopsis curtinervis Li, 2002
 Ectopsocopsis daqingshanensis Li, 2002
 Ectopsocopsis decorata (Thornton & Wong, 1968)
 Ectopsocopsis flavipedia Li, 2002
 Ectopsocopsis gannanensis Li, 2002
 Ectopsocopsis granulosa Badonnel, 1969
 Ectopsocopsis guangdongensis Li, 1991
 Ectopsocopsis jiangxiensis Li, 2002
 Ectopsocopsis lunai Badonnel, 1969
 Ectopsocopsis luteolicapita Li, 2002
 Ectopsocopsis mozambica (Badonnel, 1931)
 Ectopsocopsis phaeostictoa Li, 2002
 Ectopsocopsis pinisuga Li, 2002
 Ectopsocopsis sarmentiformis Li, 2002
 Ectopsocopsis septentrionalis Li, 2002
 Ectopsocopsis spathulata (Ball, 1943)
 Ectopsocopsis spatiosimanubra Li, 1999
 Ectopsocopsis tenuimanubria Li, 2002
 Ectopsocopsis terricolis Badonnel, 1955
 Ectopsocopsis trimaculata Li, 2002
 Ectopsocopsis xerophylla Vishnyakova, 1970

References

Ectopsocidae
Articles created by Qbugbot